He Min (born August 16, 1992) is a Chinese diver who specialises in the 1 metre springboard event. Min won a gold medal in the 1 metre springboard event at the 2010 Asian Games, and a silver of the same event in the 2011 World Aquatics Championships.

References

External links
He Min biography at gz2010.cn (official website of the 2010 Asian Games)

1992 births
Living people
Chinese male divers
Asian Games medalists in diving
Sportspeople from Hunan
People from Hengyang
Divers at the 2010 Asian Games
Asian Games gold medalists for China
Medalists at the 2010 Asian Games
20th-century Chinese people
21st-century Chinese people